A telephoto lens, in photography and cinematography, is a specific type of a long-focus lens in which the physical length of the lens is shorter than the focal length. This is achieved by incorporating a special lens group known as a telephoto group that extends the light path to create a long-focus lens in a much shorter overall design. The angle of view and other effects of long-focus lenses are the same for telephoto lenses of the same specified focal length. Long-focal-length lenses are often informally referred to as telephoto lenses, although this is technically incorrect: a telephoto lens specifically incorporates the telephoto group.

Telephoto lenses are sometimes broken into the further sub-types of short telephoto (85–135 mm in 35 mm film format), medium telephoto: (135–300 mm in 35 mm film format) and super telephoto (over 300 mm in 35 mm film format) .

Construction

In contrast to a telephoto lens, for any given focal length a simple lens of non-telephoto design is constructed from one lens (which can, to minimize aberrations, consist of several elements to form an achromatic lens). To focus on an object at infinity, the distance from this single lens to focal plane of the camera (where the sensor or film is respectively) has to be adjusted to this focal length. For example, given a focal length of 500 mm, the distance between lens and focal plane is 500 mm. The farther the focal length is increased, the more the physical length of such a simple lens makes it unwieldy.

But such simple lenses are not telephoto lenses, no matter how extreme the focal length – they are known as long-focus lenses. While the optical centre of a simple ("non-telephoto") lens is within the construction, the telephoto lens moves the optical centre in front of the construction. While the length of a long-focus lens approximates its focal length, a telephoto lens manages to be shorter than its focal length. E.g., a telephoto lens might have a focal length of 400 mm, while it is shorter than that.

A telephoto lens works by having the outermost (i.e. light gathering) element of a much shorter focal length than the equivalent long-focus lens and then incorporating a second set of elements close to the film or sensor plane that extend the cone of light so that it appears to have come from a lens of much greater focal length.  The basic construction of a telephoto lens consists of front lens elements that, as a group, have a positive focus. The focal length of this group is shorter than the effective focal length of the lens. The converging rays from this group are intercepted by the rear lens group, sometimes called the "telephoto group," which has a negative focus. The simplest telephoto designs could consist of one element in each group, but in practice, more than one element is used in each group to correct for various aberrations. The combination of these two groups produces a lens assembly that is physically shorter than a long-focus lens producing the same image size. 

This same property is achieved in camera lenses that combine mirrors with lenses. These designs, called catadioptric, 'reflex', or 'mirror' lenses, have a curved mirror as the primary objective with some form of negative lens in front of the mirror to correct optical aberrations. They also use a curved secondary mirror to relay the image that extends the light cone the same way the negative lens telephoto group does. The mirrors also fold the light path. This makes them much shorter, lighter, and cheaper than an all refractive lens, but at the cost of some optical compromises due to aberrations caused by the central obstruction from the secondary mirror.

It is designed for use with a medium format Hasselblad 203 FE camera and weighs .

The telephoto lens design has also been used for wide angles, at least once in the case of the Olympus XA where it permitted a 35 mm focal length to fit in an extra compact camera body.

Retrofocus lenses

Inverting the telephoto configuration, employing one or more negative lens groups in front of a positive lens group, creates a wide-angle lens with an increased back focal distance. These are called retrofocus lenses or inverted telephotos, which have greater clearance from the rear element to the film plane than their focal length would permit with a conventional wide-angle lens optical design. This allows for greater clearance for other optical or mechanical parts such as the mirror parts in a single-lens reflex camera.  Zoom lenses that are telephotos at one extreme of the zoom range and retrofocus at the other are now common.

History

The concept of the telephoto lens, in reflecting form, was first described by Johannes Kepler in his Dioptrice of 1611, and re-invented by Peter Barlow in 1834.

Histories of photography usually credit Thomas Rudolphus Dallmeyer with the invention of the photographic telephoto lens in 1891, though it was independently invented by others about the same time; some credit his father John Henry Dallmeyer in 1860.

In 1883 or 1884, New Zealand photographer Alexander McKay discovered he could create a much more manageable long-focus lens by combining a shorter focal length telescope objective lens with negative lenses and other optical parts from opera glasses to modify the light cone. Some of his photographs are preserved in the holdings of the Turnbull Library in Wellington, and two of these can be unequivocally dated as having been taken during May 1886. One of McKay's photographs shows a warship anchored in Wellington harbour about two and a half kilometres away, with its rigging lines and gun ports clearly visible. The other, taken from the same point, is of a local hotel, the Shepherds Arms, about 100 metres distant from the camera. The masts of the ship are visible in the background. McKay's other photographic achievements include photo-micrographs, and a ‘shadow-less technique’ for photographing fossils.

McKay presented his work to the Wellington Philosophical Society (the precursor of the Royal Society of New Zealand) in 1890.

See also
Afocal photography
Film format
Secret photography
Photographic lens design
Barlow lens
 Zoom lens

References

External links

Information on Catadioptric mirror lenses
Further clarification: Why Telephoto?
3 part series on Cheap Super Telephoto Lenses (300-500mm)
 Stanford University CS 178 interactive Flash applet showing how a telephoto zoom lens works.

Photographic lenses